Yaghnob, or Yaghnobi, may refer to:

 Yaghnob (river) in Tajikistan;
 Yaghnob Valley, a valley in Tajikistan where the Yaghnob River flows;
 Yaghnobi language, spoken in Tajikistan;
 Yaghnobi people of Tajikistan.